The following is a list of moshavim in Israel, which includes those that exist today, those that have been relocated and those that have been dismantled. As of 2018 there are a total of 451 moshavim in Israel. About 7.5% of them (34 moshavim) are considered "Moshavim Shitufiim" (מושבים שיתופיים).

Moshavim considered "Moshav Ovdim"

Moshavim considered "Moshav Shitufi"

Former moshavim

Moshavim that became community settlements

Moshavim that were merged to another municipality

Moshavim that were dismantled 
Out of the few moshavim that were dismantled in Israel's history (listed in this section), a certain portion of them has been subsequently re-established elsewhere in Israel. For those rare instances this article includes two different items - an item for the original moshav that was dismantled (listed in this section) as well as an item for the moshav that was later on re-established with the same name and/or other name.

See also 
 List of kibbutzim

 
Moshav